The Detroit Lions were founded in 1928, in Portsmouth, Ohio, as the Portsmouth Spartans and have been based in Detroit since 1934 when the team was relocated and renamed to the Detroit Lions. The Lions organization are the National Football League's (NFL's) 5th oldest franchise and compete in the NFL as a member of the National Football Conference (NFC) North division. The franchise has won four NFL championships. 

In 1963, the Pro Football Hall of Fame was created to honor the history of professional American football and the individuals who have greatly influenced it.  Since the charter induction class of 1963, 22 individuals who have played, coached, or held an administrative position for the Lions have been inducted into the Pro Football Hall of Fame. 

Of the 22 inductees, 17 made their primary contribution to football with the Lions, while the other 5 contributed only a minor portion of their career with the Lions. Calvin Johnson was the most recent Lion selected to the Hall of Fame as part of the 2021 class.

Inductees

Footnotes
Hugh McElhenny spent only a minor portion of his career with the Lions. 
Ollie Matson spent only a minor portion of his career with the Lions. 
Frank Gatski spent only a minor portion of his career with the Lions. 
John Henry Johnson spent only a minor portion of his career with the Lions.
Curley Culp spent only a minor portion of his career with the Lions.

See also 
 History of the Detroit Lions
 History of the Portsmouth Spartans
 List of Pro Football Hall of Fame inductees

References 
General
 

Specific

 
+Detroit Lions
Detroit Lions players